In Bolivia on 1 November 1979, Colonel Alberto Natusch Busch executed a coup d'état against the constitutional government of Wálter Guevara Arze, and formed his cabinet. 

MNR – Revolutionary Nationalist Movement

MNRI – Leftwing Revolutionary Nationalist Movement

PSD – Social Democratic Party

mil – military

ind – independent

Notes

Cabinets of Bolivia
Cabinets established in 1979
Cabinets disestablished in 1979
1979 establishments in Bolivia
1979 disestablishments in Bolivia